Richard Michael Beem (born August 24, 1970) is an American professional golfer who played on the PGA Tour and is best known for his upset victory at the 2002 PGA Championship.

Beem was born in Phoenix, Arizona, grew up in El Paso, Texas, and played college golf at New Mexico State University in Las Cruces.

Beem turned professional in 1994. His early career was broken up by a spell in Seattle selling car stereos and cell phones. He later regained interest after J. P. Hayes won the 1998 Buick Classic .

This changed in 1999 when Beem won the Kemper Open as a rookie. His career took a further leap forward in 2002 with a victory at The International in Castle Rock, Colorado.

Two weeks later, Beem won the 2002 PGA Championship at Hazeltine National, one of golf's four major tournaments. He shot a par 72 in the first round, but followed that with a six-under 66 in the second round to pull into a five-way tie for first place. In the third round, he again shot 72 and was the second place player, three strokes behind leader Justin Leonard. In the fourth round, Beem fended off Tiger Woods, who birdied his last four holes but finished one shot behind Beem, who shot a final round 68 to Woods' 67. This victory helped establish Beem in the top 20 of the Official World Golf Ranking.

Until this win, Beem was best known for the book Bud, Sweat and Tees: A Walk on the Wild Side of the PGA Tour by Alan Shipnuck, which profiled his rookie year on the PGA Tour and the often wild lifestyle of him and his caddie, Steve Duplantis.

At the 2007 Nissan Open at Riviera, Beem made a hole-in-one at the 14th hole on live television on Saturday to win a new red Altima coupe, which he immediately ascended, embraced, and sat atop of in triumph.  The sequence was later made into a Nissan commercial. (video) Beem credited Peter Jacobsen for inspiring his reaction; Jacobsen aced the same hole in 1994 and hopped into the nearby 300ZX convertible and pretended to drive it.

Beem was sidelined in 2010 after undergoing back surgery to repair damage to his C6 and C7 vertebrae.  While Beem was expected to only miss six weeks, rehabilitation issues caused the layoff to encompass the remainder of the 2010 season. Beem played the 2011 season on a medical exemption that required him to make $658,100 in 17 events. He missed the first six cuts of the 2011 season before making the cut at the Valero Texas Open. He finished tied for 15th. Beem made just five cuts in 21 events. As a result, he lost his tour card and played the remainder of the season out of the "past champions" category in 2012. He played on the European Tour in 2012, the last year of his ten-year exemption on that tour for winning the 2002 PGA Championship.

In 2015, Beem joined Sky Sports as a television commentator and golf analyst. He also planned to play at the UBS Hong Kong Open, but gave up his sponsor exemption to allow Ian Poulter to keep his European Tour card. In 2020, Beem was a color commentator for the video game PGA Tour 2K21. Two years later, he returned in the same role for the PGA Tour 2K23.

Beem resides in Austin, Texas.

Professional wins (4)

PGA Tour wins (3)

PGA Tour playoff record (0–1)

European Tour wins (1)

Other wins (1)

Major championships

Wins (1)

Results timeline
Results not in chronological order in 2020.

CUT = missed the half-way cut
"T" indicates a tie for a place
WD = Withdrew
NT = No tournament due to COVID-19 pandemic

Summary

Most consecutive cuts made – 2 (2002 PGA – 2003 Masters)
Longest streak of top-10s – 1

Results in The Players Championship

CUT = missed the halfway cut
"T" indicates a tie for a place

Results in World Golf Championships

QF, R16, R32, R64 = Round in which player lost in match play
"T" = Tied

Results in senior major championships

CUT = missed the halfway cut
WD = withdrew
"T" indicates a tie for a place

U.S. national team appearances
Professional
Wendy's 3-Tour Challenge (representing PGA Tour): 2002 (winners)

See also
1998 PGA Tour Qualifying School graduates
List of men's major championships winning golfers

References

External links

American male golfers
New Mexico State Aggies men's golfers
PGA Tour golfers
European Tour golfers
Winners of men's major golf championships
Golf writers and broadcasters
Golfers from Phoenix, Arizona
Sportspeople from El Paso, Texas
Golfers from Austin, Texas
1970 births
Living people